Aurelio Domínguez was a Chilean footballer.

Football career
He began play at Artillero de Costa from Talcahuano and for the Chile national football team which he participated at the 1920, 1922 and 1924 South American Championships. His first international goal was in a 2–1 loss with Uruguay in 1920.

In 1930s he played for Colo-Colo and in 1935 he was top-scorer of the Campeonato Nacional alongside Magallanes’s player Guillermo Ogaz.

Honours

Individual
 Campeonato Nacional (Chile) Top-Scorer: 1935

References

Year of birth missing
Year of death missing
Chilean footballers
Association football forwards
Chilean Primera División players
Colo-Colo footballers
Chile international footballers